"Don't You Want My Love"  is a 1979 disco single written and produced by Paul Sabu and performed by Debbie Jacobs.  Along with the track, "Undercover Lover" , "Don't You Want My Love went to #6 on the US disco chart.  "Don't You Want My Love" also went to #66 on the soul chart.

Rosabel recording
In 2000,  "Don't You Want My Love" the song was remixed and was credited to Rosabel featuring Debbie Jacobs-Rock, this version went to number one on the US dance charts

See also
 List of number-one dance singles of 2000 (U.S.)

References

Disco songs
1979 singles
2000 singles
1979 songs
Songs written by Paul Sabu